Bon Abbas Gol Bag Mir (also Romanized as Bon ‘Abbās Gol Bag Mīr; also known as Gol Bag Mīr) is a village in Afrineh Rural District, Mamulan District, Pol-e Dokhtar County, Lorestan Province, Iran. At the 2006 census, its population was 23, in 6 families.

References 

Towns and villages in Pol-e Dokhtar County